The Way may refer to:

Religion

Christian
A New Testament term referring to Christianity, e.g. in Acts 9:2
 "The Way", a term used for the Two by Twos church, also commonly known as  "Cooneyites", "Meetings", "The Truth", or "Workers and Friends"
 Dokai (Japanese: 道会, "Society of The Way"), a Japanese Christian movement founded by Matsumura Kaiseki in 1907
 The Way of the Cross, a Catholic devotion to the Passion of Christ
 The Way of Madonna Della Strada
 The Way International, a Christian denomination founded by Victor Paul Wierwille in 1942

Non-Christian
 The Way, or Dō (Way), of any number of spiritual and martial disciplines stemming from Japanese culture.
 The Way, or "Tao", of Taoism
 The Way of the Buddha Dharma, or Buddhism
 The Way of Shinto

Arts, entertainment, and media

Films
 The Way (2010 film), American film starring Martin Sheen and directed by Emilio Estevez
 The Way (2017 film), South-Korean film

Music

Groups
 The Way (band), Christian country-rock band of the early 1970s, part of the Jesus Movement

Albums

 The Way (1973 album), 1973 album by The Way
 The Way (Steve Lacy album), a 1980 album by saxophonist Steve Lacy
 The Way (2009 album), 2009 album by Kellie Loder
 The Way (Buzzcocks album), 2014 album
 The Way (Macy Gray album), 2014 album

Songs
 "The Way" (Fastball song), 1998 song released by Fastball
"The Way", a song from the album Tuonela by Amorphis
 "The Way" (Jill Scott song), 2001 song released by Jill Scott
 "The Way" (Daniel Bedingfield song), 2005 single from Daniel Bedingfield
 "The Way" (Ariana Grande song), 2013 song by Ariana Grande
 "The Way (Put Your Hand in My Hand)", 2003 single by Divine Inspiration
 "The Way/Solitaire", 2004 single by Clay Aiken
 "The Way" (CNBLUE song) CNBLUE song/mini-EP
 "The Way", song by Blues Traveler on their album Bridge
 "The Way", song by Bruce Springsteen on his 2010 album The Promise
 "The Way", song by Matchbox Twenty on their album North
 "The Way", a song by Neil Young from Chrome Dreams II
 "The Way", a song by Lynyrd Skynyrd from Vicious Cycle

Other arts, entertainment, and media
 The Way (book), 1939 book on Catholic spirituality, written by Josemaría Escrivá de Balaguer
 The Way (Greg Bear), fictional universe concerning several novels by Greg Bear
 The Way (video game), a video game released in 2016
 The Way, a 1980 sculpture by Alexander Liberman
 The Way (TV series), original title of The Path. an American drama web TV series (2016-2018)
 The Way (journal), a Jesuit spirituality journal founded in 1961.

Sports

 The Way (professional wrestling)

See also
The Two Ways in the Didache
That Way (disambiguation)
Way (disambiguation)